In mathematics, the Tor functors are the derived functors of the tensor product of modules over a ring. Along with the Ext functor, Tor is one of the central concepts of homological algebra, in which ideas from algebraic topology are used to construct invariants of algebraic structures. The homology of groups, Lie algebras, and associative algebras can all be defined in terms of Tor. The name comes from a relation between the first Tor group Tor1 and the torsion subgroup of an abelian group.

In the special case of abelian groups, Tor was introduced by Eduard Čech (1935) and named by Samuel Eilenberg around 1950. It was first applied to the Künneth theorem and universal coefficient theorem in topology. For modules over any ring, Tor was defined by Henri Cartan and Eilenberg in their 1956 book Homological Algebra.

Definition
Let R be a ring. Write R-Mod for the category of left R-modules and Mod-R for the category of right R-modules. (If R is commutative, the two categories can be identified.) For a fixed left R-module B, let  for A in Mod-R. This is a right exact functor from Mod-R to the category of abelian groups Ab, and so it has left derived functors . The Tor groups are the abelian groups defined by

for an integer i. By definition, this means: take any projective resolution

and remove A, and form the chain complex:

For each integer i, the group  is the homology of this complex at position i. It is zero for i negative.

Alternatively, one can define Tor by fixing A and taking the left derived functors of the right exact functor G(B) = A ⊗R B. That is, tensor A with a projective resolution of B and take homology. Cartan and Eilenberg showed that these constructions are independent of the choice of projective resolution, and that both constructions yield the same Tor groups. Moreover, for a fixed ring R, Tor is a functor in each variable (from R-modules to abelian groups).

For a commutative ring R and R-modules A and B, Tor(A, B) is an R-module (using that A ⊗R B is an R-module in this case). For a non-commutative ring R, Tor(A, B) is only an abelian group, in general. If R is an algebra over a ring S (which means in particular that S is commutative), then Tor(A, B) is at least an S-module.

Properties
Here are some of the basic properties and computations of Tor groups.

Tor(A, B) ≅ A ⊗R B for any right R-module A and left R-module B.
Tor(A, B) = 0 for all i > 0 if either A or B is flat (for example, free) as an R-module. In fact, one can compute Tor using a flat resolution of either A or B; this is more general than a projective (or free) resolution.
There are converses to the previous statement:
If Tor(A, B) = 0 for all B, then A is flat (and hence Tor(A, B) = 0 for all i > 0).
If Tor(A, B) = 0 for all A, then B is flat (and hence Tor(A, B) = 0 for all i > 0).
By the general properties of derived functors, every short exact sequence 0 → K → L → M → 0 of right R-modules induces a long exact sequence of the form  for any left R-module B. The analogous exact sequence also holds for Tor with respect to the second variable.
Symmetry: for a commutative ring R, there is a natural isomorphism Tor(A, B) ≅ Tor(B, A). (For R commutative, there is no need to distinguish between left and right R-modules.)
If R is a commutative ring and u in R is not a zero divisor, then for any R-module B,  where  is the u-torsion subgroup of B. This is the explanation for the name Tor. Taking R to be the ring  of integers, this calculation can be used to compute  for any finitely generated abelian group A.
Generalizing the previous example, one can compute Tor groups that involve the quotient of a commutative ring by any regular sequence, using the Koszul complex. For example, if R is the polynomial ring k[x1, ..., xn] over a field k, then  is the exterior algebra over k on n generators in Tor1.
  for all i ≥ 2. The reason: every abelian group A has a free resolution of length 1, since every subgroup of a free abelian group is free abelian.
For any ring R, Tor preserves direct sums (possibly infinite) and filtered colimits in each variable. For example, in the first variable, this says that 
Flat base change: for a commutative flat R-algebra T, R-modules A and B, and an integer i,  It follows that Tor commutes with localization. That is, for a multiplicatively closed set S in R, 
For a commutative ring R and commutative R-algebras A and B, Tor(A,B) has the structure of a graded-commutative algebra over R. Moreover, elements of odd degree in the Tor algebra have square zero, and there are divided power operations on the elements of positive even degree.

Important special cases

For an algebra A over a field k and an A-bimodule M, Hochschild homology is defined by 
For a commutative ring R with a homomorphism onto a field k,  is a graded-commutative Hopf algebra over k. As an algebra,  is the free graded-commutative divided power algebra on a graded vector space π*(R). When k has characteristic zero, π*(R) can be identified with the André-Quillen homology D*(k/R,k).

See also
Flat morphism
Serre's intersection formula
Derived tensor product
Eilenberg–Moore spectral sequence

Notes

References

External links

Homological algebra
Binary operations